Harvest moon may refer to:

 Harvest moon, the full moon closest to the autumnal equinox.

Arts and entertainment

Film and television
The Harvest Moon, a 1920 American silent drama film

Music
Harvest Moon (album), 1992, by Neil Young
"Harvest Moon" (Neil Young song)
Harvest Moon, a 2013 album by 2Yoon, or the title track
"Harvest Moon", a song by Blue Öyster Cult from the 1998 album Heaven Forbid
"Shine On, Harvest Moon", an early-1900s vaudeville song
"Harvest Moon (for Dallas)", a song by The Magic Lantern from the 2020 single "The Life That I Have"

Gaming
Story of Seasons, a life simulation series previously branded as Harvest Moon in English
 Harvest Moon (video game), the first game in the series, released in 1996 for the Super NES
 Harvest Moon (2007 video game series), a life simulation series separate from the Story of Seasons series

Other uses
Mid-Autumn Festival, also known as the Harvest Moon Festival
Harvest Moon Benefit Festival, an annual concert series in Cincinnati, Ohio
Harvest Moon, a variety of Blue Moon beer
Operation Harvest Moon, a 1965 Vietnam War operation
Project Harvest Moon, an Apollo-era proposal for commercialization of the Moon
USS Harvest Moon (1863), a Union gunboat in the American Civil War